A Bunch of Munsch is a Canadian–American animated anthology television series produced by Cinar. Each episode is based on a book by American-Canadian children's author Robert Munsch. The show aired from December 7, 1991 to December 2, 1992 on CTV in Canada and Showtime in the United States.

It was announced on January 12, 1991.

Every story featured a unique original song, usually sung by the lead character.

All episodes were released to VHS by Golden Book Video in the early 1990s. The releases were eventually packaged and updated in the late 1990s by Sony Wonder.

Originally, there was going to be an episode based on Love You Forever, but due to budget cuts, it was scrapped. Additionally, the stories are slightly different from how they're executed in the book.

Episode list
Seven episodes, each being two 11-minute segments in a 30-minute slot (the lone exception being The Paper Bag Princess, which was one 22-minute episode divided into two segments), were created:

Christmas special (1994)

Voices

DVD release
Mill Creek Entertainment released the complete series on DVD in Region 1 on August 4, 2015.

References

External links

 A Bunch of Munsch (Irre Kinderei) at fernsehserien.de

1990s Canadian animated television series
1990s Canadian anthology television series
1991 Canadian television series debuts
1992 Canadian television series endings
1990s American animated television series
1990s American anthology television series
1991 American television series debuts
1992 American television series endings
Canadian children's animated anthology television series
American children's animated anthology television series
English-language television shows
Television series by Cookie Jar Entertainment
Television series by DHX Media
Canadian television shows based on children's books
American television shows based on children's books
CTV Television Network original programming
Showtime (TV network) original programming